Asterina is a genus of asteroideans in the family Asterinidae.

The species occurring in Australian waters are considered to not be congeneric with the type species A. gibbosa (Pennant, 1777) by Rowe and Gates (1995), and will possibly to assigned to another genus or a new genus. Rowe and Gates (1995) also suggested that Asterina should be restricted to Atlantic waters.

Species
Asterina fimbriata Perrier, 1875
Asterina gibbosa (Pennant, 1777)
Asterina gracilispina Clark, 1923
Asterina hoensonae O'Loughlin, 2009
Asterina krausii Gray, 1840
Asterina lorioli Kœhler, 1910
Asterina martinbarriosi López-Márquez, Acevedo, Manjón-Cabeza, García-Jiménez, Templado & Machordom, 2018
Asterina pancerii (Gasco, 1876)
Asterina phylactica Emson & Crump, 1979
Asterina pusilla Perrier, 1875
Asterina pygmaea Verrill, 1878
Asterina squamata Perrier, 1875
Asterina stellaris Perrier, 1875
Asterina stellifera (Möbius, 1859)
Asterina stellifera obtusa Leipoldt, 1895
Asterina vicentae López-Márquez, Acevedo, Manjón-Cabeza, García-Jiménez, Templado & Machordom, 2018

References

Further reading
Clark, A. M. (1993). An index of name of recent Asteroidea – Part 2: Valvatida. In Jangoux, M. & Lawrence, J. (Eds.), Echinoderm Studies (187–366). Volume 4. Rotterdam: A. A. Balkema.
Clark, A. M. & Downey, M. E. (1992). Starfishes of the Atlantic. London: Chapman & Hall.

 
Echinoidea genera